Enrique 'Kike' Tortosa Palma (born 10 February 1991) is a Spanish footballer who plays for FC Jove Español San Vicente as a forward.

Club career
Born in Valencia, Tortosa made his senior debut with Valencia CF's reserves in the 2008–09 season, in the Segunda División B. After being sparingly used, he joined Recreativo de Huelva on 29 January 2011.

Tortosa played his first match as a professional on 15 April 2011, coming on as a second-half substitute in a 1–1 home draw against FC Barcelona B in the Segunda División. He appeared in a further three matches for Recre during the campaign.

On 13 January 2012, Tortosa signed with division three club Deportivo Alavés. He only featured twice during his spell, and joined fellow league side CD Alcoyano in the summer.

Despite playing more regularly with the latter, Tortosa was released and moved to Gimnàstic de Tarragona on 19 July 2013, being initially assigned to its farm team. On 6 July 2016, he signed for SD Leioa of the third tier.

References

External links

1991 births
Living people
Footballers from Valencia (city)
Spanish footballers
Association football forwards
Segunda División players
Segunda División B players
Tercera División players
Valencia CF Mestalla footballers
Recreativo de Huelva players
Deportivo Alavés players
CD Alcoyano footballers
CF Pobla de Mafumet footballers
Gimnàstic de Tarragona footballers
SD Leioa players
CD Eldense footballers